Arik Yanko (born 21 December 1991) is an Israeli professional association football player.

Biography

Playing career 
Arik Yanko starting playing youth football with Hapoel Tel Aviv. As a youth team player, Yanko cracked four teeth during a derby match against Maccabi but played out the entire match. This endeared him to the youth team staff who saw the young goalkeeper as having a strong character.

Yanko made his league debut in a Premier League match against Maccabi Petah Tikva on 4 April 2009 when he replaced Ben Luz in the 80th minute after back up goalkeeper Yaniv Mizrahi was red-carded. In October 2009, Yanko said that that moment was by far the most exciting moment of his career.

International career 
Yanko represented Israel at the 2009 Maccabiah Games, winning a bronze medal.

In 2013, Yanko was a part of Israel U21 squad.

References

Footnotes 

1991 births
Living people
Competitors at the 2009 Maccabiah Games
Israeli footballers
Hapoel Tel Aviv F.C. players
Hakoah Maccabi Amidar Ramat Gan F.C. players
Hapoel Ra'anana A.F.C. players
Maccabi Petah Tikva F.C. players
Maccabi Bnei Reineh F.C. players
Liga Leumit players
Israeli Premier League players
Maccabiah Games medalists in football
Maccabiah Games bronze medalists for Israel
Israeli people of Romanian-Jewish descent
Footballers from Rishon LeZion
Israel under-21 international footballers
Association football goalkeepers